Eleanor of England (18 June 1269 – 29 August 1298) was the eldest surviving daughter of King Edward I of England and his first wife, Eleanor of Castile.

What evidence exists for Eleanor's early years suggests that while her parents were absent on Crusade between 1270 and 1274, she became very close to her paternal grandmother, Eleanor of Provence, with whom she continued to spend a good deal of time. She was also close to her sickly brother Henry. On one Pentecost Eve, Henry and Eleanor were given two partridges for their dinner, for a special treat.
 
For a long period Eleanor was betrothed to King Alfonso III of Aragon. Alfonso's parents were under papal interdict, however, because of their claims to the throne of Sicily, which were contrary to the papal donation of the Sicilian throne to Count Charles I of Anjou, and despite the Aragonese ruler's repeated pleas that Edward send his daughter to them for marriage, Edward refused to send her as long as the interdict remained in place. In 1282 he declined one such request by saying that his wife and mother felt the girl, who had just turned 13, was too young to be married, and that they wanted to wait another two years before sending her to Aragon. Alfonso died before the marriage could take place.

Eleanor subsequently married Count Henry III of Bar on 20 September 1293, and had two children:
Edward I, Count of Bar, married to Mary, daughter of Robert II, Duke of Burgundy
Joan of Bar, Countess of Surrey, married to John de Warenne, 7th Earl of Surrey

Eleanor is also credited with a daughter named Eleanor (b.1285), who married to a Welshman named Llywelyn ap Owain, lord of South Wales and representative of the sovereign princes of South Wales.

Eleanor died at Ghent on 29 August 1298. Eleanor was buried in Westminster Abbey, but the location of her grave in the Abbey is unknown.

Family tree

References

Sources

1269 births
1298 deaths
13th-century English people
13th-century English women
English princesses
House of Plantagenet
Daughters of kings
Children of Edward I of England
Burials at Westminster Abbey